Hamilton was a federal electoral district represented in the House of Commons of Canada from 1867 to 1904. It was located in the province of Ontario and consisted of the city of Hamilton.

It was created by the British North America Act of 1867. In 1872, it was assigned a second seat in the House of Commons so that it elected two Members of Parliament at each election.

The electoral district was abolished in 1903 when it was divided into Hamilton West and Hamilton East ridings.

Election results

|}

|-

|Conservative Labour
|Henry Buckingham Witton  
|align="right"| 1,422  
|align="right"|x  

|}

|Conservative Labour
|Henry Buckingham Witton  
|align="right"|  1,515         
|align=center|  
|}

On the election being declared void in each case:

 

|-

|Conservative Labour
|Henry Buckingham Witton  
|align="right"|  1,691        
|align=center|  

|}

|}

|}

|}

|}

|}

See also 

 List of Canadian federal electoral districts
 Past Canadian electoral districts

External links 
Riding history from the Library of Parliament

Former federal electoral districts of Ontario